Richard Costa (born 5 January 1992) is an Indian footballer who plays as a midfielder for Churchill Brothers in the I-League. He is currently the captain of the team.

Career

Churchill Brothers
Costa, after going through his youth career at Churchill Brothers, made his debut for the senior squad in the I-League on 11 October 2012 against ONGC F.C. at the Fatorda Stadium, coming on as a 68th-minute substitute for Bikramjit Singh in a match that Churchill won 5–0.

East Bengal
In May 2017, East Bengal announced the signing of Richard Costa and Surabuddin Mullick from Churchill Brothers.
On 12 January 2018, East Bengal released Gabriel Fernandes and Richard Costa from their squad.

Churchill Brothers
Costa Returned to his previous club Churchill Brothers after he got released from East Bengal.

Career statistics

Club

Honour

Goa lusophony 
2014 Lusophony Games: Gold Medal

References

Indian footballers
1992 births
Living people
I-League players
Churchill Brothers FC Goa players
Association football midfielders
Footballers from Goa
East Bengal Club players